Levsen Organ Company is a manufacturer of pipe organs based out of Buffalo, Iowa, which is near the Quad Cities. 

Levsen began operations as a tuning and repair facility for electric pianos and organs in 1954.  For the first 11 years, this would be the scope of the business.  Company founder Rodney E. Levsen began working with a major pipe organ builder, and completed an apprenticeship.  After this he began offering his services tuning and repairing pipe organs.

In 1980 he began building organs under the Levsen name.  , he has built 53 organs of a variety of sizes, and is currently working on an additional six organs.  Levsen organs can be found throughout the United States.  He also helps service and maintain over 150 existing instruments, mainly in the upper midwest.  In addition to organ work, his company has developed tools and computer software that is also used by other builders.

References

External links
 Levsen Organ Company

Pipe organ building companies
Musical instrument manufacturing companies of the United States